Li is a village area in Sokndal municipality in Rogaland county, Norway. It is located along the southeastern coast of the Jøssingfjorden, southeast of the municipal centre of Hauge.

See also
List of short place names

References

Sokndal
Villages in Rogaland